In mathematics, the Hadamard derivative is a concept of directional derivative for maps between Banach spaces. It is particularly suited for applications in stochastic programming and asymptotic statistics.

Definition 
Note that this definition does not require continuity or linearity of the derivative with respect to the direction . Although continuity follows automatically from the definition, linearity does not.

Relation to other derivatives 
 If the Hadamard directional derivative exists, then the Gateaux derivative also exists and the two derivatives coincide.
 The Hadamard derivative is readily generalized for maps between Hausdorff topological vector spaces.

Applications 
A version of functional delta method holds for Hadamard directionally differentiable maps. Then for a measurable map  that is Hadamard directionally differentiable at  we have  (where the weak convergence is with respect to Borel sigma-field on the Banach space ).

This result has applications in optimal inference for wide range of econometric models, including models with partial identification and weak instruments.

See also

 
  - generalization of the total derivative

References

Directional statistics
Generalizations of the derivative